The Pavilhão Nossa Senhora do Monte or N. Sra do Monte (in English: Our Lady of the Hill) is an Angolan indoor sporting arena located in Lubango, Huíla. The arena, built on the occasion of the 2007 Afrobasket, along with the Pavilhão Acácias Rubras in Benguela, Pavilhão Serra Van-Dúnem in Huambo and the Pavilhão do Tafe in Cabinda, has a 2,000-seat capacity.

See also
 Pavilhão Acácias Rubras
 Pavilhão Serra Van-Dúnem
 Pavilhão do Tafe

References

Lubango
Buildings and structures in Lubango
Basketball venues in Angola